The Springfield Model 1873 was the first standard-issue breech-loading rifle adopted by the United States Army (although the Springfield Model 1866 had seen limited issue to troops along the Bozeman Trail in 1867). The gun, in both full-length and carbine versions, was widely used in subsequent battles against Native Americans.

The Model 1873 was the fifth variation of the Allin trapdoor design, and was named for its hinged breechblock, which opened like a trapdoor. The infantry rifle model featured a 32-inch (829 mm) barrel, while the cavalry carbine used a  barrel.  It was superseded by an improved model, the Springfield Model 1884, also in .45-70 caliber.

Selection process
In 1872–1873 a military board, headed by Brigadier-General Alfred H. Terry, conducted an examination and trial of 99 rifles from several domestic and foreign manufacturers including those from Springfield, Sharps, Peabody, Whitney, Spencer, Remington, and Winchester pursuant to the selection of a breech-loading system for rifles and carbines for the U.S. Military. The trials included tests for accuracy, dependability, rate-of-fire, and ability to withstand adverse conditions. Both single shot and magazine equipped systems were considered but, at the time, the single shot was deemed to be more reliable. Firing tests were held at the Springfield Armory and Governor's Island where the average rate of fire for the Springfield was 8 rounds per minute for new recruits and 15 rounds per minute for experienced soldiers. The board recommended "No. 99 Springfield" which became the Model 1873.

Ballistics

The Springfield Model 1884 had a muzzle velocity of 1315.7 feet per second with a 500 grain lead bullet. The muzzle velocity of the carbine bullet was 1,150 feet per second. The 1884 model rifle generated 1525 ft lbs of energy at 100 yds, and 562.3 ft lbs of energy at 1,000 yards, with a maximum range of 3,500 yards.

Operating chamber pressure of the Springfield Model 1884, firing the 45-70-500, is 25,000 psi.

The average accuracy of the Springfield Model 1873 was a circle with an average radius of 1.7 inches at 100 yards, corresponding to an ~3.4 MOA. The average accuracy of the Springfield Model 1884 was a circle with an average radius of 1.3 inches at 100 yards, corresponding to ~2.6 MOA. Therefore, the accuracy potential of the average Springfield Model 1884 is comparable to that of the German K98k or Springfield's later M1 Garand.

U.S. ordnance department tests report that "A practiced person can fire this arm from 12 to 13 times per minute, loading from the cartridge-box. (It has been fired from the shoulder at the rate of 25 times per minute from the cartridge-box)."

Use in combat
The rifle was originally issued with a copper cartridge case and used in the American West during the second half of the 19th century. However, poor quality control with copper cases and poor storage conditions not uncommonly led to cartridge case separations upon firing.

Original U.S. Ordnance Department instructions for the Springfield Model 1873 write: "Should the head of a cartridge come off in the act of firing, the best mode of extracting the shell is to take out a ball from a cartridge and reduce it with a knife or by rolling, so that it can be inserted into the muzzle of the barrel. Ram the ball hard with the ramrod when the breech-block is closed; this will upset the ball and fill the headless shell. Open the breech-block and the ball and shell can be easily pushed out with the ramrod." Soldiers were later issued with a purpose-designed headless-shell extractor to remedy case-head separations and jams.

After the defeat of Lieutenant-Colonel George Armstrong Custer's battalion (armed with the carbine and carbine load ammunition) at the Battle of the Little Bighorn in June 1876, investigations first suggested that jamming of their carbines may have played a factor, although archaeological excavations in 1983 discovered evidence that only 3.4 percent of the cases recovered showed any indication of being pried from jammed weapons. This did not account for cases removed by a cleaning rod or other objects nor for jammed rifles cleared away from the immediate battle area and outside the very limited archaeological survey area.  Every Custer battalion weapon became Indian property.  Captain Thomas French, M Company Commander was kept busy on the Reno defensive position line using the cleaning rod from his infantry rifle to clear the jammed carbines passed to him from the cavalryman on the line.  The cartridge was subsequently redesigned with a brass case, since that material did not expand as much as copper. This was shown to be a major improvement, and brass became the primary material used in United States military cartridges from then to the present. After the Little Big Horn disaster, troops were required to perform target practice twice a week.
 
The black powder Model 1873 continued to be the main service rifle of the U.S. military until it was gradually replaced by the Springfield Model 1892 bolt action rifle, essentially a copy of the Norwegian Krag–Jørgensen action. Replacement began in 1892, and despite its obsolescence, the Model 1873 was still used by secondary units during the Spanish–American War in Cuba and the Philippines, where it was at a major disadvantage against  Spanish forces armed with the 7 mm Spanish Model 1893 Mauser bolt-action rifle.

Gallery

See also
 Springfield rifle
Martini-Henry

References

External links

Springfield firearms
Hinged breechblock rifles
Rifles of the United States
Guns of the American West
Weapons and ammunition introduced in 1873